The 2017–18 Gibraltar Second Division was the fifth season of the second-tier football in Gibraltar since the Gibraltar Football Association joined UEFA. Like the previous season, this year the league was contested by 9 clubs. The season began on 26 September 2017, and is expected to end in May 2018, with a mid-season break anticipated while Victoria Stadium underwent improvements. There will be no Chesterton's Cup this season.

Gibraltar Phoenix were the reigning champions, having won the league for the first time the previous season and earning promotion to the Premier Division. Boca Gibraltar won their first title this season, securing the title by a single point after a 1–1 draw with arch-rivals Bruno's Magpies on the final day of the season.

Format
Clubs play each other twice for a total of 16 matches each. The Second Division winner is promoted while the second-placed team enters a playoff with the ninth-placed team from the Premier Division. This season sees the continuation of the Home Grown Player (HPG) rule, requiring clubs to name 3 home grown players in their matchday squads with at least one of them on the field of play at all times. On 1 October, FC Olympique were awarded a 3–0 win over College 1975 after College fielded an ineligible player. The match had originally finished 2–1 to Olympique.

On 2 February 2018, Angels were expelled from the league due to violations of squad quota and Home Grown Player rules, with their record expunged.

Teams

Gibraltar Phoenix were promoted to the 2017–18 Gibraltar Premier Division as champions last season. Bruno's Magpies lost their promotion playoff, so remain in the division. Europa Pegasus had applied to join the division for the coming season after their expulsion at the end of the 2015–16 season, but the Gibraltar Football Association turned down their request, citing new rules now forbidding feeder clubs from joining the Gibraltar football pyramid.

Managerial Changes

1 Norberto Alonso Simón was re-appointed by Leo in January after initially being dismissed by the new owners.

League table

Results

Season statistics

Scoring

Top scorers

15 goals for College 1975

Hat-tricks

Clean sheets

See also
2017–18 Gibraltar Premier Division

References

External links
Gibraltar Football Association

Gibraltar Second Division seasons
Gib
2017–18 in Gibraltar football